Samuel Humphreys (23 November 1778 – 16 August 1846) was a noted American naval architect and shipbuilder in the early 19th century. He served the United States Navy as the Chief Constructor for the Navy from 1826 to 1846.

Naval architect 

Samuel Humphreys supervised the construction of the frigate , which was laid down at Philadelphia, Pennsylvania, in 1798, and launched in 1799. He later constructed ships at the Philadelphia Navy Yard, and supervised the construction of the ship-of-the-line , the first ship to be laid down at the yard, in 1815.

In 1824, Humphreys turned down a very lucrative offer from Emperor Alexander I of Russia to create a Russian navy, saying: "I do not know that I possess the merits attributed to me, but, be they great or small, I owe them all to the flag of my country."

In 1826, Humpherys was elected a member of the American Philosophical Society.

Humphreys was Chief Constructor for the Navy from 1826 to 1846.  He designed Americas first first-rate ship-of-the-line, which was laid down in 1821, but not launched until 1837. He also designed the supply ship , which was laid down in 1835 and launched in 1836.

Around 1827, Humphreys took on John Lenthall as his apprentice to work as his assistant and draftsman, and in 1828 he nominated Lenthall for a position as one of the assistant naval constructors at the Philadelphia Navy Yard. Lenthall would go on to serve as Chief Constructor for the Navy from 1849 to 1853 and as Chief of the Navys Bureau of Construction and Repair from 1853 to 1871.

Family 

Humphreys's father was Joshua Humphreys (1751-1838), the naval architect for the first six frigates of the U.S. Navy.  Samuel, and his wife Letitia, had sons Andrew (1810-1883) and Joshua (1813–1873) who served in the Union Army and Confederate States Navy, respectively, in the American Civil War (1861-1865).  His other children were Jane Murray McCrabb (1813–1897), Mary Yonge (1823–1866), and William Humphreys (1828–1897).

Samuel Humphreys is buried at the Congressional Cemetery in Washington, D.C., with his sons Andrew and Joshua.

See also 
United States naval architect
Naval architecture

Notes

References 

 Chapelle, Howard I. The History of the American Sailing Navy: The Ships and Their Development. New York: W. W. Norton & Company, Inc., 1949. .
 Tucker, Spencer C., ed.  Civil War Naval Encyclopedia.  Santa Barbara, California: ABC-CLIO, 2011, .

External links
 Inventory of the Humphreys Family Papers, 1840-1918, in the Southern Historical Collection, UNC-Chapel Hill
Samuel Humphreys Letterbook, 1824-1845, MS 146 and his Directions for cutting Timber for a Frigate of the first Class, 1835, MS 194 held by Special Collections & Archives, Nimitz Library at the United States Naval Academy

1778 births
1846 deaths
American naval architects
United States Navy civilians
American shipbuilders
Burials at the Congressional Cemetery
American people of Welsh descent